Vepris lanceolata (umZane or white ironwood) is a large, evergreen tree of South Africa.

Pictures

References

External links

Vepris lanceolata at PlantZAfrica.com

lanceolata
Flora of South Africa
Trees of South Africa
Trees of Mediterranean climate
Afromontane flora